Rae Anderson may refer to:
 Rae Anderson (squash player)
 Rae Anderson (athlete)

See also
 Ray Anderson (disambiguation)